Pablo César Zegarra Zamora (born 1 April 1973) is a Peruvian retired footballer who played as a midfielder, and is a manager.

Most of his career was associated with Salamanca in Spain, as both a player and a manager. He played in two La Liga seasons with the club, in the late 1990s. He gained 31 caps for Peru; his younger brother Carlos also played for the national team.

Club career
Born in the capital Lima, Zegarra started his career in 1991 with Sporting Cristal, moving just one year after to Colombia with Independiente de Santa Fe. He changed countries again in 1994, experiencing one unassuming spell at Argentinos Juniors.

In the following summer, Zegarra arrived in Spain, where he would remain for the following eight years, only interrupted with two loans spells: after a solid season in Segunda División for CD Badajoz, he signed with UD Salamanca in the same level, scoring eight times in 30 games in his debut season en route to a La Liga promotion – in the following two top division campaigns, however, he would be sparingly used (23 matches combined, two goals).

After the second of his two loans, in Portugal with S.C. Farense, Zegarra was released by Salamanca in the 2003 summer, returning to his country to play for Club Alianza Lima. However, he returned to Spain shortly afterwards, representing amateurs CD Guijuelo. Following a period of inactivity, he quit football altogether in 2007 at 34, his last club being also in Lima, Universitario de Deportes.

Zegarra returned to Salamanca after his retirement, starting his coaching career. In November 2011 the 38-year-old was appointed first-team manager, with the side competing in Segunda División B.

International career
During six years, Zegarra won 31 caps for the Peru national team, scoring once. He was summoned for the squad at the 1993 Copa América.

References

External links

1973 births
Living people
Peruvian people of Spanish descent
Footballers from Lima
Peruvian footballers
Association football midfielders
Peruvian Primera División players
Sporting Cristal footballers
Club Alianza Lima footballers
Club Universitario de Deportes footballers
Categoría Primera A players
Independiente Santa Fe footballers
Argentine Primera División players
Argentinos Juniors footballers
La Liga players
Segunda División players
Segunda División B players
CD Badajoz players
UD Salamanca players
CD Guijuelo footballers
Primeira Liga players
S.C. Farense players
Peru international footballers
1993 Copa América players
Peruvian expatriate footballers
Expatriate footballers in Colombia
Expatriate footballers in Argentina
Expatriate footballers in Spain
Expatriate footballers in Portugal
Peruvian expatriate sportspeople in Colombia
Peruvian expatriate sportspeople in Argentina
Peruvian expatriate sportspeople in Spain
Peruvian expatriate sportspeople in Portugal
Peruvian football managers
Segunda División B managers
UD Salamanca managers
Sporting Cristal managers
Peruvian expatriate football managers
Expatriate football managers in Spain
Atlético Grau managers